"County Fair/Rainbows" is a single by anti-folk band The Moldy Peaches.  The single was released on April 1, 2002 on Rough Trade Records, and consists of two songs on one CD track.

Track listing
 "County Fair" - 1:57
 "Rainbows" - 4:16

References

2002 singles
The Moldy Peaches songs
Rough Trade Records singles